José W. Bustos was a Mexican film editor who began his career during the Golden Age of Mexican cinema. His brother Jorge Bustos was also an editor.

Selected filmography
 Narciso's Hard Luck (1940)
 I'm a Real Mexican (1942)
 María Eugenia (1943)
 Summer Hotel (1944)
The Disobedient Son (1945)
 The Noiseless Dead (1946)
 Music Inside (1947)
 The Lost Child (1947)
 The Tiger of Jalisco (1947)
 Music, Poetry and Madness (1948)
 Hypocrite (1949)
 Rough But Respectable (1949)
 The Woman of the Port (1949)
 The Mark of the Fox (1950)
 Serenade in Acapulco (1951)
 Oh Darling! Look What You've Done! (1951)
 Crime and Punishment (1951)
 Here Comes Martin Corona (1952)
 The Price of Living (1954)
 The Sin of Being a Woman (1955)
 Look What Happened to Samson (1955)
 Barefoot Sultan (1956)
 Rebel Without a House (1960)
 His First Love (1960)
 Satanic Pandemonium (1975)
 The Divine Caste (1977)

References

Bibliography 
 Emilio José Gallardo Saborido. Gitana tenías que ser: las Andalucías imaginadas por las coproducciones fílmicas España-Latinoamérica. Centro de Estudios Andaluces, 2010.

External links 
 

Year of birth unknown
Year of death unknown
Mexican film editors